Leo Frederick Merrett (5 April 1920 – 18 October 1976) was an Australian rules footballer who played in the VFL in between 1940 and 1949 for the Richmond Football Club.

Family
The son of Frederick Merrett, and Ellen Clarice Merrett, née Buckley, Leo Frederick Merrett was born at Nhill, Victoria, on 5 April 1920.

He married Sheila Nora Etheridge on 22 April 1944.

His brother-in-law was the Richmond footballer Dave Baxter.

He is the great-grandfather of Western Bulldogs player Bailey Smith.

Football
Merrett was a member of Richmond's 1943 VFL Grand Final victory against Essendon.

In November 1946, Merrett was appointed as the captain / coach of the Border United Football Club.

In January, 1947, it was announced that Richmond Football Club refused Merrett a clearance to coach the Border United Football Club.

Footnotes

References 
 Hogan P: The Tigers Of Old, Richmond FC, (Melbourne), 1996. 
 Richmond football player Leo Merrett holding a football, collection of the State Library of Victoria.

External links
 
 
 Leo Merrett, at Boyles Football Photos.

Richmond Football Club players
Richmond Football Club Premiership players
Jack Dyer Medal winners
Australian rules footballers from Victoria (Australia)
Nhill Football Club players
1976 deaths
1920 births
One-time VFL/AFL Premiership players